The Renault R27 is a Formula One racing car designed and produced by Renault for the 2007 Formula One season. The chassis was designed by Bob Bell, James Allison, Tim Densham and Dino Toso with Pat Symonds overseeing the design and production of the car as Executive Director of Engineering and Rob White leading the engine design. The car was driven by Giancarlo Fisichella and Heikki Kovalainen.

It made its first public outing on 16 January 2007, at Jerez circuit after completing a short first test at Silverstone the week before.

Aerodynamics
The R27 is outwardly similar to the 2006 R26, with several aerodynamic modifications. The front wing design, for example, is very similar to the R26's. One unusual new feature is the placing of the rear view mirrors on the strakes on outer edge of the sidepod, following a concept introduced by Ferrari on their 2006 car (the 248 F1).

Despite the apparent similarities to its predecessor, the R27 did not emulate its results. The car proved to be relatively uncompetitive and the team slumped to fourth, generally being slower than Ferrari, McLaren, and BMW. The R27 failed to score any wins for the first time since 2002 and took only one podium, at the rain-soaked Japanese Grand Prix in the hands of rookie Heikki Kovalainen. In comparison, the R26 won on its debut and won the 2006 Constructors' and Drivers' championships. The team put the car's uncompetitive form down to an over-reliance on the team's wind tunnel which had shown incorrect readings for how the car would perform, aerodynamically, on the track. By the end of the year, the car was being out-paced by Renault-powered Red Bull, Williams, Scuderia Toro Rosso, Toyota and Honda. Many put this down to the team abandoning its development and focusing on the 2008 car.

Gearbox
The new seven-speed Instantaneous GearChange (ICG) gearbox is Renault's first attempt at a seamless shift gearbox. It proved to be very reliable with Kovalainen making only one retirement all season, which was due to an accident in the Brazilian Grand Prix.

Livery 

The R27's 2007 livery reflected the team's then-new title sponsor, the ING Group, and consisted of an assortment of colours including orange, white, yellow and dark blue. The colour scheme was not positively received by all Formula One fans, however.

An interim livery - dark blue and yellow - was used during early test sessions and at the car's official launch in Amsterdam on 24 January.

Gallery

Complete Formula One results
(key) (results in bold indicate pole position)

References

Notes

External links
 ING Renault F1 Team debuts R27 at Jerez
 Fisi shakes down new R27
 Detailed specification of the R27

R27
2007 Formula One season cars